The Bukit Perai Protection Forest is found on the island of Borneo in Indonesia. This site is 1000 km2.

References

Protected areas of Indonesia
Borneo